Chieveley House, on the High Street in the village of Chieveley, Berkshire is a country house dating from the early 18th century. It is a Grade II* listed building. It has had a number of notable owners including  Valentine Wyndham-Quin, son of Windham Wyndham-Quin, the Baroness Howard de Walden and Lord Goff of Chieveley.

History and description
The house was built around 1716, identifiable by dates on the rainwater heads. Pevsner records Chieveley as one of a range of "grand houses [set] behind high brick walls" on the village's High Street. At the time of its construction the occupants are recorded as a gentleman, his four children, and six servants. In the 20th century the house was occupied by Valentine Wyndham-Quin, son of Windham Wyndham-Quin and subsequently the Baroness Howard de Walden. In 1976, Chieveley was bought by Lord Goff of Chieveley, who took the name of the village when made a Lord of Appeal in Ordinary and a life peer in 1986.

Pevsner describes Chieveley as a "compact hipped roofed dolls' house of red brick". The architectural style is Queen Anne.

The current owners created a garden to the designs of Arne Maynard. In 2018 Chieveley was put up for sale with Knight Frank for £3.5 million.

References

Sources
 

Country houses in Berkshire
Houses completed in the 18th century
Grade II* listed houses
Grade II* listed buildings in Berkshire
Queen Anne architecture in the United Kingdom
Chieveley